Conservula malagasa is a moth of the family Noctuidae. It is found in Madagascar and the Comoros

Gaede described this species as close to Conservula sinensis Hampson, 1908 with a wingspan of 27 mm

References

Moths described in 1915
Amphipyrinae
Moths of Madagascar
Moths of the Comoros